Maxim Alexeyevich Shipov (born 10 May 1987, in Moscow) is a Russian-born figure skater who competed mainly for Israel. Shipov represented Russia at one international competition, the 2005 Skate Israel. After switching to Israel and sitting out the mandatory wait period, he began appearing internationally for Israel in 2007. A three-time Israeli national champion, he competed at eight ISU Championships and qualified to the free skate at the 2011 European Championships in Bern, Switzerland.

Programs

Competitive highlights

References

External links

 

Russian male single skaters
Israeli male single skaters
Living people
1987 births
Figure skaters from Moscow
Competitors at the 2009 Winter Universiade